Mustafa III (Muṣṭafā-yi sālis; 28 January 1717 – 21 January 1774) was the Sultan of the Ottoman Empire from 1757 to 1774. He was a son of Sultan Ahmed III (1703–30), and his consort Mihrişah Kadın. He was succeeded by his brother Abdul Hamid I (1774–89).

Early life
Mustafa was born at the Edirne Palace on 28 January 1717. His father was Sultan Ahmed III, and his mother was Mihrişah Kadın. He had a full brother named, Şehzade Süleyman. In 1720, a large fifteen day circumcision ceremony took place for Mustafa, and his brothers, princes Süleyman, Mehmed, and Bayezid. In 1730, after the Patrona Halil revolt, led to the deposition of his father Sultan Ahmed III, and the succession of his cousin Sultan Mahmud I, Mustafa, his father, and brothers were all locked up in the Topkapı Palace. In 1756, after the death of his elder half-brother Mehmed, he became heir to the throne.

Reign

Accession
Mustafa ascended the throne on 30 October 1757, after the death of his cousin Osman III, the son of Sultan Mustafa II.

Character of Mustafa's rule
Soon after his accession to the throne, Mustafa demonstrated a special care for justice. He took a number of measures to increase prosperity in Istanbul. He regulated coinage, built large grain stores, maintained aqueducts, and established a strict fiscal policy. He traveled frequently and checked whether the laws he had enforced were followed.

Treaty with Prussia
Mustafa much admired Frederick the Great's generalship, and in 1761 established a peace treaty with Prussia. Frederick wanted an alliance against the Habsburgs, and Mustafa wanted to modernize his state and army. Mustafa preferred recruiting his officers in Berlin, rather than in Paris and London, to re-organize his army. In 1763, the two countries exchanged their diplomats for the first time.

Russo-Turkish War (1768–1774)

Koca Ragıp Pasha, who remained grand vizier until 1763, pursued a peace policy towards neighboring countries. But the increasing influence of Russia over the Caucasus and its intention to control Poland created tension between the Ottomans and Russia. Ragıp Pasha's successor Muhsinzade Mehmed Pasha also preferred to remain at peace, and Mustafa's insistence on war ( "I will find some means of humbling those infidels" )with Russia led to his resignation in 1768. The Sultan expected to gain an easy victory over the Russians, but in fact the Ottomans were unprepared for a long war. During the war, military reforms were undertaken, with the assistance of French officer François Baron de Tott. They included the modernization of artillery corps and the foundation of the Naval Engineering School in 1773. The war was disastrous for the Ottoman Empire. The Russian armies occupied the Crimea, Romania and parts of Bulgaria.

Architecture
Many monumental buildings including the Fatih Mosque, which was built by Mehmed the Conqueror was rebuilt from the ground during his reign. In addition, he had built Laleli Mosque complex, and the shore along the Yenikapı filled to set up a new neighborhood. Apart from these, he undertook other construction projects after the earthquakes of 1766,
and 1767.

Personal life

Poetry

He was a poet, his poetry being written under the pseudonym of Cihangir.

(Ottoman Turkish)

"Yıkılupdur bu cihan sanma ki bizde düzele
Devleti çarh-ı deni verdi kamu müptezele
Şimdi erbab-ı saadette gezen hep hazele
İşimiz kaldı hemen merhamet-i lem yezele."

(Translation)

"This world has ruined, don't even think with us it recovers,
It was the lousy fate that has delivered the power to vulgars,
Now the perfidious ones have populated the Imperial Palace,
It's now the mercy of the everlasting God that runs our business.

Family

Consorts 
Mustafa III had seven known consorts:     
 Aynülhayat Kadın (c. 1746 - 1 August 1764).  Probably  BaşKadin (first consort), is sometimes considered Mustafa's legal wife. She was the mother of at least one daughter and had a sister, Emine Hanim, in the harem like her. She built the Katırcıham Mescid Mosque on 1760. She was buried in Laleli.
  Mihrişah Kadin (c. 1745 - 16 October 1805). She was of Genoese or Georgian origins, she was the mother of Selim III and at least two daughters. She was BaşKadin or became BaşKadin on the death of Aynülhayat Kadın.
 Fehime Kadın  (? - 1761). She died in childbirth, but is not known who was or what happened to the child, although some theorize she may be Şah Sultan. 
 Rifat Kadın (c. 1744 - December 1803). Free-born woman, Mustafa met her while touring Istanbul undercover. She was then entrusted to the Grand Vizier's wife for educate her before entering the harem. Possible mother of Şah Sultan. After Mustafa's death, she returned to her family. She was buried in the Haydarpaşa cemetery.
  Ayşe Adilşah Kadin (c. 1748 - 19 December 1803). Of Circassian origin, she was the mother of two daughters. She was buried in the garden of the mausoleum of Mustafa III.
 Binnaz Kadın (c. 1740 - May 1823). Childless, after Mustafa's death she was married to Çayırzâde İbrahim Ağa. She was buried in the Hamidiye mausoleum.
 Gülman Hanim. BaşIkbal. Also called Gülnar Hanim.

Sons 
Mustafa III had at least two sons:  
 Selim III (24 December 1761 - 28 July 1808) - with Mihrişah Kadin. 28th Sultan of the Ottoman Empire.
 Şehzade Mehmed (10 January 1767 - 12 October 1772). His tutor was Küçük Hüseyn Ağa. He was buried in the Mustafa III mausoleum.

Daughters 
Mustafa III had at least nine daughters:     
 Hibetullah Sultan (17 March 1759 - 7 June 1762) - with Mihrişah Kadin. Also called Heybetullah Sultan or Heyyibetullah Sultan. Her was the first imperial birth in 29 years, and was therefore celebrated for ten days and ten nights in an extremely luxurious way. Her nurse was Emine Hanim, sister of Aynülhayat Kadın, and, being Mustafa's mother, Mihrişah Kadin, died, was his sister, Saliha Sultan, wife of the Grand Vizier, who presided over her Cradle Procession. At three months, she was betrothed to Hamid Hamza Paşah. In the luxurious ceremony, her father gave her the lands of Gümrükçü, but she died of illness at the age of three before being able to celebrate the marriage. She was buried in the Mustafa III mausoleum.
  Şah Sultan (21 April 1761 - 11 March 1803) - with Rifat Kadın or Fehime Kadın. Of frail health, she was engaged twice, but both were executed before the wedding. She eventually managed to marry and had two biological daughters and an adoptive one.
 Mihrimah Sultan (5 February 1762 - 16 March 1764) - with Aynülhayat Kadın. Her birth was celebrated for five days. She was buried in the Mustafa III mausoleum.
 Mihrişah Sultan (9 January 1763 - 21 February 1769) - perhaps with Aynülhayat Kadın. Her birth was celebrated for three days. She was buried in the mausoleum of Mustafa III.
  Beyhan Sultan (13 January 1766 - 7 November 1824) - with Adilşah Kadin. She married once and had a daughter.
 Hatice Sultan (15 June 1766 - 1767) - possibly with Aynülhayat Kadın.
  Hatice Sultan (14 June 1768 - 17 July 1822) - with Adilşah Kadin. She married once and had a son.
 Fatma Sultan (9 January 1770 - 26 May 1772) - with Mihrişah Kadin. She was buried in the mausoleum of Mustafa III.
 Reyhan Sultan (? -?). She died as a child.

Death
Mustafa died of heart attack on Friday, 21 January 1774, at the Topkapı Palace, and was buried in his own mausoleum located at Laleli Mosque, Istanbul. He was succeeded by his brother Abdul Hamid I. His death left the empire struggling with economic and administrative problems.

References

Bibliography

External links 
 

[aged 56]

1717 births
1774 deaths
18th-century Ottoman sultans
Turks from the Ottoman Empire
People of the Russo-Turkish War (1768–1774)